Saccostrea glomerata, is an oyster species belonging to the family Ostreidae.

It is endemic to Australia and New Zealand. In Australia, it is known as the Sydney rock oyster and is commercially farmed. In New Zealand, where the species is not farmed, it is known as the New Zealand rock oyster or Auckland oyster. The species is closely related to Saccostrea cucullata, the hooded oyster, which is common on Indo-Pacific rocky shores.

Sydney rock oysters are capable of tolerating a wide range of salinities (halotolerant).

Taxonomy 
The Sydney rock oyster and New Zealand rock oyster have previously been classified as two separate species: Saccostrea commercialis and S. glomerata, respectively.  They have also been grouped with the hooded oyster into a single species, S. cucullata.

When proposing the name Ostrea commercialis in 1933, Iredale & Roughley noted that the New South Wales oyster had been variously referred to species O. cucullata Born (Ascension Island), O. mordax Gould (Fiji), O. glomerata Gould (New Zealand), O. circumsuta Gould (Fiji); and even to O. trigonata Sowerby and O. mytiloides Lamarck.

Distribution
In Australia it is found in bays, inlets and sheltered estuaries from Wingan Inlet in eastern Victoria, along the east coast of New South Wales, and north to Hervey Bay, Queensland, around northern Australia and south along the west coast to Shark Bay in Western Australia. The spat for these oysters travels down the east coast of Australia on the East Australia Current. Also, a small population exists on the islands in the Furneaux archipelago in Bass Strait, and in Albany on the south west coast of Western Australia, where they are farmed.

Breeding
Sydney rock oysters are "broadcast spawners", that is, eggs and sperm are released into open water where fertilisation occurs.  Within hours of fertilisation, the eggs develop into free-swimming planktonic larvae.  The larvae swim in estuarine and coastal waters for up to three weeks, during which they develop transparent shells and retractable feet.  The larvae then settle on clean substrates using their feet to find suitable sites.  The larval foot is resorbed once the larva is attached.  The shell darkens and the small animal takes on the appearance of an adult oyster.

Growth rates vary with local conditions, but they generally reach  in three years.  Sydney rock oysters may change sex during life.  Many start out as males and later change to females.  About 60% of prime eating oysters are female. Selective breeding has reduced the time to market size from three to two years. Great success in selection for disease resistance to two protozoan diseases of oysters, namely, QX disease Marteilia sydneyi and winter mortality Bonamia roughleyi, has been achieved.

Oysters are filter feeders, straining planktonic algae from the water.  Birds, fish, stingrays, mud crabs, and starfish all eat Sydney rock oysters, with the Australian pied oystercatcher being particularly fond of them.

Commercial industry
A substantial commercial oyster farming industry is found in New South Wales and southern Queensland, with a small, emerging industry in Albany, Western Australia. The industry produces a gourmet product and provides employment in isolated coastal communities. In Australia, oysters in peak flesh condition (i.e. spawning condition) are preferred for the half-shell trade.

Consumption

Sydney rock oysters are best consumed when freshly shucked, but do have a good shelf life when kept whole, of up to 14 days providing they are kept at the correct temperature and handled safely.

Notes

References

External links
 CIESM page on oyster species in the Mediterranean
  [CC-By-SA]
 https://www.dpi.nsw.gov.au/content/research/areas/aquaculture/outputs/2008/nell Retrieved 7 April 2022

glomerata
Commercial molluscs
Australian cuisine
Bivalves of Australia
Bivalves of New Zealand
Fauna of Western Australia
Bivalves described in 1850
Taxa named by Augustus Addison Gould